Stewart Lord (9 April 1940 - 4 March 2022) was an Australian rules footballer who played with Geelong in the VFL during the early 1960s. He was the twin brother of Brownlow Medal winning teammate Alistair Lord.

Lord usually played at halfback although he played his first season in the forward line when he kicked all of his 13 career goals.

On 6 July 1963 he was a member of the Geelong team that were comprehensively and unexpectedly beaten by Fitzroy, 9.13 (67) to 3.13 (31) in the 1963 Miracle Match. A member of Geelong's 1963 premiership team, Lord retired at the end of 1964, aged 24, to become a coach.

He captain-coached Camperdown, and was non playing coach of Geelong West.

His identical twin brother, Alistair Lord, won the Brownlow Medal in 1962.

See also
 1963 Miracle Match

References

External links

1940 births
2022 deaths
Australian rules footballers from Victoria (Australia)
Geelong Football Club players
Geelong Football Club Premiership players
Cobden Football Club players
Camperdown Football Club players
Camperdown Football Club coaches
Geelong West Football Club coaches
Australian twins
Twin sportspeople
Identical twins
People educated at Geelong College
One-time VFL/AFL Premiership players